Mr. T (born 1952) is an American actor and former bodyguard.

Mr. T or Mister T may also refer to:

People
 Nguyễn Cường (born 1989), or Mr. T, Vietnamese beatboxer
 Denis Thatcher (1915–2003), husband of British Prime Minister Margaret Thatcher, herself known as "Mrs. T"
 Tom Tolbert (born 1965), American sports radio personality
 Stanley Turrentine (1934–2000), American jazz saxophonist

Other
 Mr. T (album), a 1981 album by Conway Twitty
 Mr. T (comics)
 Mister T (TV series), an animated series based on the actor
 Mr & Mrs T, a line of drink mixers owned by Dr Pepper Snapple Group, Inc.
 Mr. T and Tina, an American TV series starring Pat Morita
 A character representing the letter T from the children's television series The Letter People
 A song on the Regurgitator's 1997 album Unit
 Mr. T, the main character from blaxploitation movie Trouble Man
 El Que Sabe, Sabe, an album by Tego Calderón, originally set to be titled Mr. T